Adoración Apolo Sánchez, a.k.a. Dori, is a Spanish retired football striker and former athlete, who mainly as CE Sant Gabriel's captain in the Spanish First Division. As a javelin thrower she was a national champion.

References

External links
Profile at Txapeldunak.com 

1979 births
Living people
People from Mataró
Sportspeople from the Province of Barcelona
Spanish women's footballers
Primera División (women) players
Spanish female javelin throwers
Women's association football forwards
CE Sant Gabriel players